Man Controlling Trade is the name given to two monumental equestrian statues created by Michael Lantz for the Federal Trade Commission Building in Washington, D.C. under the United States Department of the Treasury Section of Painting and Sculpture.  The works were dedicated in 1942. Each of the two limestone groups is approximately 12 feet tall and 16 feet long.

In July 1937 the Section of Painting and Sculpture announced an open competition to design and execute two large sculptures for the Federal Trade Commission Building. The competition attracted over 500 models from 234 sculptors,

See also
 1942 in art
 List of New Deal sculpture
 List of public art in Washington, D.C., Ward 6

References

External links
 

1942 establishments in Washington, D.C.
1942 sculptures
Allegorical sculptures in Washington, D.C.
Equestrian statues in Washington, D.C.
Federal Trade Commission
Limestone statues in the United States
Monuments and memorials in Washington, D.C.
Outdoor sculptures in Washington, D.C.
Sculptures by American artists
Section of Painting and Sculpture
Stone sculptures in Washington, D.C.
Federal Triangle